Bungard may refer to several villages in Romania:

 Bungard, a village in Lechinţa Commune, Bistriţa-Năsăud County
 Bungard, a village in Șelimbăr Commune, Sibiu County